Saraiyahat is a village in the Saraiyahat CD block in the Dumka Sadar subdivision of the Dumka district in the Indian state of Jharkhand.

Geography

Location

Overview
The map shows a large area, which is a plateau with low hills, except in the eastern portion where the Rajmahal hills intrude into this area and the Ramgarh hills are there.  The south-western portion is just a rolling upland. The entire area is overwhelmingly rural with only small pockets of urbanisation.

Note: The full screen map is interesting. All places marked on the map are linked in the full screen map and one can easily move on to another page of his/her choice. Enlarge the full screen map to see what else is there – one gets railway connections, many more road connections and so on.

Area

Demographics
According to the 2011 Census of India, Saraiyahat had a total population of 1,459, of which 771 (53%) were males and 688 (47%) were females. Population in the age range 0–6 years was 220. The total number of literate persons in Saraiyahat was 1,239 (91.12% of the population over 6 years).

Civic administration

Police station
There is a police station at Saraiyahat.

CD block HQ
Headquarters of Saraiyahat CD block is at Saraiyahat village.

Education
Kasturba Gandhi Balika Vidyalaya, Saraiyahat, is a Hindi-medium girls only institution established in 2005. It has facilities for teaching from class VI to class XII.

Government High School Saraiyahat is a Hindi-medium coeducational institution established in 1986. It has facilities for teaching from class IX to class XII.

Model School Saraiyahat is an English-medium coeducational institution established in 2011. It has facilities for teaching from class VI to class XII.

Project Girls High School Saraiyahat is a Hindi-medium girls only institution established in 1985. It has facilities for teaching from class VI to class X.

References

Villages in Dumka district